Ronny Hoareau (born 20 March 1983) is captain of Northern Dynamo FC in the Seychelles First Division. He is also a national representative, playing defence with the Seychelles national football team since 2004. His position is center back.

External links

1983 births
Living people
Seychellois footballers
Place of birth missing (living people)

Association football defenders
Seychelles international footballers
21st-century Seychellois people